František Schneider (born 21 April 1987) is a Czech football player.

References
Guardian Football

Profile at Vysočina Jihlava website

1987 births
Living people
Czech footballers
Czech First League players
FC Zbrojovka Brno players
FC Vysočina Jihlava players
1. FK Příbram players
Association football midfielders